The Zoomer, designation NPS50, is a scooter developed by Honda and introduced in Japan and America in late 2002 for the 2003 model year. In Canada and the US, the scooter is marketed as the Ruckus. The Zoomer differs from more traditional scooters with its rugged design, including fatter tires with deeper tread and a skeletal frame lacking an enclosed storage compartment. The NPS50 shares similar motor and drivetrain components with the CHF50.

The Zoomer sold in European countries features a compact, single point programmed fuel injection (PGMFI) system, consisting of a single fuel injector, a different fuel pump arrangement, and an oxygen sensor fitted just before the exhaust silencer.

Honda claims that the Ruckus returns  in EPA tests.

See also
 Honda Big Ruckus, or PS250, a 249 cc scooter
 Honda PCX for similarities in technology

References

External links

 Honda Power-sports USA Official Ruckus Page
 CMG Online 2003 model review CMG Online 2003 Ruckus review
 CMG Online 2005 model long-term review CMG Online 2005 Ruckus long-term review

Zoomer
Motor scooters
Motorcycles introduced in 2002